Callum Wilson (born 23 June 1999) is a Scottish professional footballer who plays as a midfielder for Scottish League Two club Albion Rovers.

Career
Wilson began his career at Partick Thistle; he moved on loan to Elgin City in February 2019. After leaving Thistle, Wilson moved to Scottish League One side Dumbarton in January 2020. After making just five appearances for the club, he was released in July 2020, and signed for Albion Rovers later that month.

References

1999 births
Living people
Scottish footballers
Association football midfielders
Partick Thistle F.C. players
Elgin City F.C. players
Scottish Professional Football League players
Dumbarton F.C. players
Albion Rovers F.C. players